A list of films released in Japan in 1968 (see 1968 in film).

List of films

See also 
1968 in Japan
1968 in Japanese television

References

Footnotes

Sources

External links
Japanese films of 1968 at the Internet Movie Database

1968
Japanese
Films